Coleophora bistrigella is a moth of the family Coleophoridae. It is found in the United States, including Colorado and Texas.

The larvae feed on the leaves of Hymenoxys species. They create a trivalved, tubular silken case.

References

bistrigella
Moths of North America